The Men's 800m athletics events for the 2016 Summer Paralympics take place at the Estádio Olímpico João Havelange from September 8 to September 16, 2016. A total of four events were contested over this distance for five different classifications.

Schedule

Medal summary

Results

The following were the results of the finals of each of the Men's 800 metres events in each of the classifications. Further details of each event are available on that event's dedicated page.

T34

17:50 14 September 2016:

T36

19:23 17 September 2016:

T53

19:01 15 September 2016:

T54

12:02 15 September 2016:

References

Athletics at the 2016 Summer Paralympics
2016 in men's athletics